The British Society for Neuroendocrinology (BSN) was formally established in 2001 to promote learning and research into neuroendocrinology. Publications of the Society include the Journal of Neuroendocrinology and Neuroendorcrine Briefings. Since 1989 the society has awarded annually the Mortyn Jones Lectureship to a researcher who has made a major contribution to neuroendocrine research. The BSN is a registered charity in the UK; however, participation is welcomed from around the world.

History
This society was founded as the British Neuroendocrine Group in 1985, formally constituting as the British Society for Neuroendocrinology (BSN) in 2001.

Major activities
The society is a registered charity in the United Kingdom (no 1002014) whose aims are to promote learning and research into neuroendocrinology: the interplay between the endocrine and nervous systems that control important body functions and behaviour. The ultimate aim of this research is to provide therapies for the many neuroendocrine diseases and disorders that may develop throughout life, and to develop methods to beneficially regulate normal neuroendocrine function in humans and animals. The society offers educational resources and networking opportunities to support members at all stages of their career.

Publications
The society established the Journal of Neuroendocrinology in 1989 under the editorship of Prof Stafford Lightman.  It is now published by Wiley, Prof Julian Mercer (University of Aberdeen) is the Editor-in-Chief. The society also publishes Neuroendorcrine Briefings, a resource for teaching and communication, on an occasional basis.

Membership
Ordinary membership is open to researchers, clinicians and students in the field of neuroendocrinology, endocrinology and related disciplines. Although based in the UK, the BSN welcomes participation from around the world. Honorary membership is awarded by the executive committee of the society to persons of special distinction in neuroendocrinology.

Mortyn Jones Lectureship
The British Society for Neuroendocrinology awards annually the Mortyn Jones Lectureship to a researcher who has made a major contribution to neuroendocrine research.

References

External links
Home page of the British Society for Neuroendocrinology

British biology societies
Medical associations based in the United Kingdom
Neuroscience organizations